Francisco de Miranda Municipality may refer to the following places in Venezuela:

Francisco de Miranda Municipality, Anzoátegui
Francisco de Miranda Municipality, Guárico
Francisco de Miranda Municipality, Táchira

See also
 Miranda Municipality (disambiguation)
 Miranda (disambiguation)
 Francisco de Miranda, a Venezuelan military leader and revolutionary, and the namesake of the municipalities

Municipality name disambiguation pages